Helen Christine Blatch (née Wilson; 24 January 1934 – 31 December 2015) was a British actress on stage and screen, best remembered on screen for her roles in Doctor Who (in the serials The Deadly Assassin and The Twin Dilemma) and The Practice, and on stage for her casting as "Cerimon, a lord of Ephesus", in the Royal Shakespeare Company's 1989–1990 performance of Pericles.

Career
Born in Southampton, Hampshire, Blatch trained at The Questors Student Group Course, finishing in 1958, and performed with the Questors for some years afterwards. She spent some years in repertory, working with directors such as Sam Walters, David Scase, David Thacker and Phyllida Lloyd. Her performances attracted positive reviews ("Miss Blatch .. is capable of an extraordinary tranquillity of both voice and manner, against which slight nuances of intonation or expression register with great effect"; "Helen Blatch captures perfectly the fragility and neuroses of the regressing morphine addict living in a dream of the past"; "Helen Blatch is strong and striking ... Her wit is waspish, her frailty acute, her quest for affection chilling.")

She joined the Royal Shakespeare Company in 1989, and, in her first season there, was described by one reviewer as "a find". Her casting as Cerimon, "a lord of Ephesus", in Shakespeare's Pericles was considered by one contemporary reviewer as "a brilliant stroke, for Cerimon (Helen Blatch) becomes a healer whose urgent goodness and brightly pitched grief has us eating magic from her hand." Another reviewer said "this presentation of power within gentleness, strength within femininity, was profoundly impressive." 

A 2004 survey of performances of Pericles said "Helen Blatch brought to the part a combination of compassionate humanity and priestly authority", and commented, "In a virtuoso piece of doubling, Helen Blatch went on to play the Bawd in brothel scenes that were positively Hogarthian in their fetid realism; by having one actress play parts so different, Thacker emphasized the way in which Pericles ... brings together contrasting extremes: here, .. juxtaposed in a single performer." Since Blatch's performance, Cerimon has often been cast as female. 

Blatch appeared in many other classic and modern plays. For her role in Sir Peter Shaffer's The Gift of the Gorgon, she learned Greek from a 'How to Speak Greek' tape and tourist guidebook. Her performance in Sir David Hare's Racing Demon as "Espy's understandably unhappy wife" was particularly noted as "affecting ... their final scene of clenched and frigid misery sends a shiver down the spine." She appeared in films also (including different roles in two versions of A Doll's House) and in many TV series. Her longest-enduring television role was as Nora Madkay in the ITV series The Practice, but she is perhaps best known for her two roles in Doctor Who: the voice of the Matrix in the 1976 serial The Deadly Assassin, and Fabian in the 1984 serial The Twin Dilemma.

Selected stage performances

Selected filmography

Personal life
Blatch commented in a 2002 interview that she had entered the theatre against her father's wishes. It was announced in January 2018 that Blatch died on 31 December 2015, aged 82.

References

External links
 

1934 births
2015 deaths
Actresses from Southampton
British stage actresses
British television actresses